Elections for the members of 5th Provincial assembly of Sindh were held on 17th December 1970, first session was held on 2nd May 1972.

List of members of the 5th Provincial Assembly of Sindh 

Tenure of the 5th Provincial assembly of Sindh was from 2nd May 1972 till 13th January 1977.

References 

Provincial Assembly of Sindh
Politics of Sindh